Cardinal Wolsey is a 1912 silent short film drama directed by Laurence Trimble and written by and starring Hal Reid. It was based on the play Henry VIII by William Shakespeare. It was produced by the Vitagraph Company of America and distributed through the General Film Company.

An incomplete copy of the film is preserved in the National Film and Television Archive, British Film Institute.

Cast
Hal Reid - Cardinal Wolsey
Julia Swayne Gordon - Catherine of Aragon
Clara Kimball Young - Anne Boleyn
Tefft Johnson - King Henry VIII
Robert Gaillard - Gardiner, later Bishop of Winchester
Logan Paul - Thomas Cranmer, Archbishop of Canterbury
George Ober - Bishop of Essex
Hal Wilson - King's friend (*Harold Wilson)

References

External links

1912 short films
American black-and-white films
Films directed by Laurence Trimble
Vitagraph Studios short films
Silent American drama films
1912 drama films
1912 films
American silent short films
1910s American films